Linchang station, is a station of Line 3 of the Nanjing Metro. It started operations on 1 April 2015. It is named after the nearby Laoshan Forestry, and located along the east-west Pusi Road at its intersection with Longpan Road.

References

Railway stations in Jiangsu
Nanjing Metro stations
Railway stations in China opened in 2015